Zamalek Sporting Club, commonly referred to as Zamalek, is an Egyptian sports club based in Cairo, Egypt. The club is mainly known for its professional football team, which currently plays in the Egyptian Premier League, the top tier of the Egyptian football league system. The Zamalek SC football team has had 51 different managers, including caretaker managers, throughout its history since 1946.

List of managers 

This is a complete list of all the managers in the history of Zamalek SC football team since 1946.

[C] = Caretaker manager

Notes

References

Zamalek SC
Zamalek SC managers